Charlie Baines (9 February 1896–1954) was an English footballer who played in the Football League for Barnsley.

References

1896 births
1954 deaths
English footballers
Association football midfielders
English Football League players
Ardsley Athletic F.C. players
Barnsley F.C. players